Crambus proteus is a moth in the family Crambidae. It was described by Graziano Bassi and Wolfram Mey in 2011. It is found in South Africa.

References

Crambini
Moths described in 2011
Moths of Africa